KSHW-LP, VHF analog channel 6, was a low-powered television station licensed to Sheridan, Wyoming, United States. The station was last owned by Lovcom, Inc., and last broadcast a sports radio format with programming from Fox Sports Radio.

History
Northern Wyoming Community College was granted a construction permit for a channel 6 translator of ABC affiliate KTWO-TV (channel 2) in Casper, and assigned the call letters K06AT, on July 31, 1979. In 2007, the college transferred the facility to Nexstar Media Group, owners of Fox affiliate KHMT (channel 4) at Hardin, Montana, which the station was rebroadcasting, for no purchase price.

Lovcom, Inc., owner of the Sheridan Media cluster of radio stations, purchased K06AT from Nexstar in 2010 after being successful in obtaining authorization to move the station to the tower of its KYTI. At that time, it began airing sports radio programming, originally from ESPN Radio, which had previously aired on an HD Radio subchannel of KYTI.

As with all television stations operating as radio stations on channel 6, this station was required to convert to digital on July 13, 2021, ending the FM radio service. Lovcom had advocated in filings with the Federal Communications Commission for technologies that would allow the transmission of an ATSC signal and the FM audio program in the same 6 MHz, but no ATSC 3.0 modification was ever filed for KSHW-LP, which closed at the deadline and had its license deleted.

References

External links

SHW-LP
SHW-LP
1979 establishments in Wyoming
Television channels and stations established in 1979
Sheridan County, Wyoming
2021 disestablishments in Wyoming
Television channels and stations disestablished in 2021
Defunct television stations in the United States
SHW-LP